Sonneberg Observatory is an astronomical observatory and was formerly an institute of the Academy of Science in the German Democratic Republic. It was founded in 1925 by Cuno Hoffmeister and is located in Sonneberg, Thuringia, Germany. The Sonneberg Observatory has one of the world's largest collections of photographic plates in its museum of astronomy.

See also 
 List of astronomical observatories

References

External links 

  

Astronomical observatories in Germany
Buildings and structures in Sonneberg (district)
Science and technology in East Germany